Chen Chien Ming (1906–1987), also known as Yogi C. M. Chen or simply as Yogi Chen, was a Chinese hermit who lived in Kalimpong, India, from 1947 until 1972, when he moved to the United States, where he lived for the remainder of his life.

According to Ole Nydahl, Chen had, in his youth in China, been terrified of death and had at first practiced Taoist life-extending exercises. Later he turned to Buddhism and, in search of teachings, went to Tibet, where he spent several years living in a cave.

Sangharakshita regarded Chen as one of his teachers, and together with Khantipalo helped him compile Buddhist Meditation, Systematic and Practical. Both Sangharakshita and Khantipalo describe Chen as "eccentric."

References

External links
 Website of Buddhist Yogi C. M. Chen
 Talk by Sangharakshita on Yogi Chen
 How to Develop the Bodhicitta
 Buddhist Meditation: Systematic and Practical (pdf)
 The Lighthouse in the Ocean of Chan, a work on Zen Koans

1906 births
1987 deaths
Chinese hermits
Chinese spiritual writers
Republic of China Buddhists
American writers of Chinese descent
History of Buddhism in China
20th-century Chinese people